Elva is the fourth studio album by the San Diego-based punk rock band Unwritten Law, released in 2002 by Interscope Records. With it the band moved away from their previously established skate punk style, and towards a more accessible alternative rock sound. The band found success with the song "Seein' Red", which reached #1 on the US Modern Rock Tracks charts. This is the band's last studio album to feature founding drummer Wade Youman until their 2022 album, The Hum.

Elva features guest appearances by Tony Kanal of No Doubt, Josh Freese of The Vandals, and Neville Staple of The Specials. The two "Raleigh Soliloquy" tracks are recordings of the rants of Raleigh Theodore Sakers. Previous recordings of his rants numbered soliloquies I-III had appeared on the Sublime album Robbin' the Hood. After the closing track "Evolution" there is a phone message to singer Scott Russo from Blink-182 singer/guitarist Tom DeLonge, a close friend of the band who had grown up with them in their home town of Poway.

Track listing

Personnel

Unwritten Law
Scott Russo – lead vocals
Steve Morris – lead guitar, backing vocals
Rob Brewer – rhythm guitar, backing vocals 
Pat "PK" Kim – bass guitar
Wade Youman – drums

Additional musicians
Nicholas Wright – guitar on "Elva"
Josh Freese – drums on "Up All Night"
John Shanks – additional guitar on "Sound Siren," slide guitar on "Actress, Model..."
Miguel – upbeat guitar on "How You Feel," lead guitar on "Seein' Red"
Marshall Goodman – percussion on "Up All Night" and "Hellborn"
Michael Fisher – Indian percussion on "Babalon"
The Allday Singers – group vocals on "Babalon"
Tony Kanal – bass guitar on "Rest of My Life"
Neville Staples – DJ vocal on "Evolution"
Raleigh Theodore Sakers – spoken vocals on tracks 12 & 14

Artwork
Steven R. Gilmore – sleeve design, layout, art direction, line drawings (based on original drawings by Wade Youman)
Wade Youman and Marc B. – art direction
Mark Baldswin – cover paintings
Dean Karr – photography

Production
John Shanks and Miguel – Producers
Josh Abraham – producer and mixing of "Rest of My Life"
Mark DeSisto and Tobias Miller – engineers
Dan Chase, Tal Herzberg, and Baraka – Pro Tools
Eddie Ashworth – additional engineering
Mike McMullen and Jerry Moss – assistant engineers
David J. Holman – mixing
Mixed at Cactus Studio Hollywood
Brian Gardner – mastering

Charts

Album

Singles

References

Unwritten Law albums
2002 albums
Albums produced by Josh Abraham
Albums produced by John Shanks
Alternative rock albums by American artists